Mats Bolmstedt (July 8, 1920 – December 9, 1965) was a Swedish speed skater who competed in the 1948 Winter Olympics and in the 1952 Winter Olympics.

In 1948 he finished tenth in the 500 metres competition and 17th in the 1500 metres event.

External links
 Speed skating 1948 

1920 births
1965 deaths
Swedish male speed skaters
Olympic speed skaters of Sweden
Speed skaters at the 1948 Winter Olympics
Speed skaters at the 1952 Winter Olympics
20th-century Swedish people